The sinking of Namyoung-Ho was a marine accident that occurred in the sea near South Korea on December 15, 1970.

Overview
On December 15, 1970, the South Korean ferryboat Namyoung sank in the Korea Strait.

Boat 
The ferry was a 362-ton vessel, with a reported capacity of 302 persons and 150 tons of cargo.

Incident 
On December 12, 1970 the ferry departed with 338 passengers on board en route to Jeju island from Busan. The sinking on December 14 was blamed on overloading of the vessel, with initial reports stating that the ferry tilted to one side after 150 crates of tangerines had been placed on one side of the ship. Investigations revealed that the Namyoung had a capacity of 150 tons of cargo but was carrying 500 tons of cargo. Additionally, rescue was delayed as the original SOS from the ferry was either not received or ignored by the Coast Guard, which contributed to the high casualty rate. There were a reported 326 deaths or missing persons.

See also 

 List of South Korean ferry disasters
 Sinking of MV Sewol

References 

Maritime incidents in South Korea
Shipwrecks in the Yellow Sea
Ferries of South Korea
Maritime incidents in 1970
December 1970 events in Asia
1970 in South Korea